Bima Bharti (born 1 January 1973) is an Indian politician and the Ex Minister of Sugarcane Industries in the Government of Bihar. She is currently a leader of Janata Dal (United) and a member of Bihar Legislative Assembly. She has been elected as the representative of the Rupauli constituency 4 times from November 2000 onward. Shankar Singh had defeated her in February 2005 but she was re-elected again in October 2005.

Political career 
Bima Bharti began her political career in 2000. She contested as an independent candidate from the Rupauli constituency and was elected to the Bihar Legislative Assembly. Subsequently, she became a member of the Rashtriya Janata Dal. In the February 2005 election, she lost the seat to Shankar Singh of the Lok Janshakti Party but in the following October election, she was able to win back the seat. She subsequently quit the Rashtriya Janata Dal and joined the Janata Dal (United) before the 2010 Bihar Legislative Assembly election. She was re-elected in 2010 and again in 2015 as a member of the Janata Dal (United).

Personal life 
Bharti is married to Awadhesh Mandal who was convicted of intimidation of witnesses in a murder case. In January 2015, she helped her husband, who had multiple criminal cases against him, escape from  jail. Her 21-year-old son was discovered dead in August 2018. Another son was beaten in 2019.

References

Janata Dal (United) politicians
Bihar MLAs 2015–2020
Bihar MLAs 2010–2015
People from Purnia district
Living people
Women members of the Bihar Legislative Assembly
21st-century Indian women politicians
21st-century Indian politicians
Bihar MLAs 2020–2025
1973 births